Zhuzilin Depot is the depot of Shenzhen Metro Line 1. It is located at the south of Shennan Boulevard and east of Qiaochengdong Road in Futian District, Shenzhen, China. It acts as operations control centre of Line 1 and Line 2, and maintenance workshop of Shenzhen Metro Line 1. It has one track to connect to nearby Zhuzilin Station.

See also 
Zhuzilin Station

References

External links

Zhuzilin Station with exits in English/Chinese/Pinyin

Shenzhen Metro depots